The 2018 World Archery Championships was the 14th edition of the World Indoor Archery Championships. The event was held in Yankton, United States from 14 February to 19 February 2018 and was organised by World Archery (formerly known as FITA). Qualification and elimination rounds took place at the NFAA Easton Yankton Archery Center. 

The programme featured was the same as previous World Archery Championships, with individual and team events in the compound and recurve disciplines.

Medal summary

Recurve

Senior

Junior

Compound

Senior

Junior

Medal table

Participating nations
At the close of registrations, a 31 nations had registered 207 athletes, 3 fewer country and 55 athletes fewer than in Ankara in 2016.

  (12)
  (4)
  (1)
  (1)
  (1)
  (11) 
  (3)
  (9)
  (10)
  (5)
  (8)
  (1)
  (9)
  (1)
  (18)
  (7)
  (1)
  (3)
  (20)
  (3)
  (6)
  (1)
  (1)
  (6)
  (15)
  (6)
  (1)
  (3)
  (4)
  (12)
  (24) host

References

External links
Official website
Championships details
Complete result book

World Championship
Archery
International archery competitions hosted by the United States
2018
Yankton County, South Dakota
World Indoor Archery